Kenneth A. Bollen (born 1951) is the Henry Rudolf Immerwahr Distinguished Professor of Sociology at the University of North Carolina at Chapel Hill. Bollen joined UNC-Chapel Hill in 1985. He is also a member of the faculty in the Quantitative Psychology Program housed in the L. L. Thurstone Psychometric Laboratory. He is a fellow at the Carolina Population Center, the American Statistical Association and the American Association for the Advancement of Science. He was also the Director of the Odum Institute for Research in Social Science from 2000 to 2010. His specialties are population studies and cross-national analyses of democratization.

He is the author of several books and over a hundred papers, which have attracted a very large number of citations over the years. His best known publication, Structural Equations with Latent Variables, has been cited over 32,000 times. It integrated a diverse body of literature from several disciplines, and helped define the area of structural equation modeling (SEM).

According to the National Science Foundation, "His best known substantive research is on the measurement, determinants, and consequences of liberal democracy in nations. The research revealed conservative and liberal biases in democracy measures and provided new measures that minimized the bias. He and colleagues delivered the first empirical estimates of the effects of British colonial history, world system position, and religious traditions on democracy." The National Science Foundation has Bollen on its Advisory Committee for Social, Behavioral & Economic Sciences.

Honors and awards 
In 2018, he won a career award of Psychometric society for lifetime achievement.

In 2011, he was an Elected Fellow of the American Statistical Association. For the period 2010–2012, he was Elected Chair, Chair, Past Chair of the Section on Social, Economic, and Political Sciences of the American Association for the Advancement of Science (AAAS). In 2008, he was and Elected Fellow of the American Association for the Advancement of Science.

In 2002, he was added to the ISI Highly Cited database of "highly cited researchers" in the Social Sciences category as well as being recognized by a Reuters list.

In 2000 he was the recipient of the Lazarsfeld Award for Methodological Contributions in Sociology, the highest award
for methodologists given by the American Sociological Association.

Books
Structural Equations with Latent Variables, Wiley, 1989
Latent Curve Models: A Structural Equation Perspective (with Patrick Curran), Wiley, 2005

References

External links 
 Homepage at the University of North Carolina at Chapel Hill
 Homepage at CPC the University of North Carolina at Chapel Hill
 Bio at NISS

American sociologists
American statisticians
1951 births
University of North Carolina at Chapel Hill faculty
Living people
Fellows of the American Association for the Advancement of Science
Fellows of the American Statistical Association
Brown University alumni
Quantitative psychologists